Burlington is a city in the Regional Municipality of Halton at the west end of Lake Ontario in Ontario, Canada. Located approximately half way between Toronto and Niagara Falls, it is part of the Greater Toronto Area and Hamilton metropolitan census area.

History

Before the 19th century, the area between the provincial capital of York and the township of West Flamborough was home to the Mississauga nation. In 1792, John Graves Simcoe, the first lieutenant governor of Upper Canada, named the western end of Lake Ontario "Burlington Bay" after the town of Bridlington in the East Riding of Yorkshire, England.

The British purchased the land on which Burlington now stands from the Mississaugas in Upper Canada Treaties 3 (1792), 8 (1797), 14 (1806), and 19 (1818). Treaty 8 concerned the purchase of the Brant Tract,  on Burlington Bay which the British granted to Mohawk chief Joseph Brant for his service in the American Revolutionary War. Joseph Brant and his household settled on this tract of land around 1802. Brant is accordingly often referred to as the founder of Burlington, and the city of Burlington still celebrates an annual Joseph Brant Day in early August. Subsequent disputes between the Mississaugas of the Credit First Nation and the Canadian government over payment for the Brant Tract and the Toronto Purchase were settled in 2010 for the sum of $145 million (CAD).

By the turn of the 19th century, the name "Burlington" was already in common use. With the completion of the local survey after the War of 1812, the land was opened for settlement. Early farmers prospered in the Burlington area because the area had fertile soil and moderate temperatures. Produce from the farms was shipped out via the bustling docks of the lakeside villages of Port Nelson and Wellington Square, as well as Brown's Wharf in the nearby village of Port Flamborough (which was to become Aldershot). Lumber taken from the surrounding forests also competed for space on the busy docks. In the latter half of the 19th century, increased wheat production from Western Canada convinced local farmers to switch to fruit and vegetable production.

In 1873, the villages of Wellington Square and Port Nelson merged to become the Village of Burlington which then became the Town of Burlington in 1914. The arrival of large steamships on the Great Lakes made the small docks of the local ports obsolete, and the increased use of railway to ship goods marked the end of the commercial wharves.

Farming still thrived though, and the resultant growth resulted in continued prosperity. By 1906, the town boasted its own newspaper—the Burlington Gazette—as well as a town library and a local rail line that connected Burlington to nearby Hamilton. During the First World War, 300 local men volunteered for duty in the Canadian Expeditionary Force—38 did not return. In 1914, Burlington was incorporated into a town.

As more settlers arrived and cleared the land, cash crops replaced subsistence farming. Gradually, mixed farming and market gardens became the dominant form of agriculture, and in the early 20th century the area was declared the Garden of Canada. The first peaches grown in Canada were cultivated in the Grindstone Creek watershed in the city's south-west part. The farming tradition has passed down through the generations. Today over forty percent of the Grindstone Creek watershed is still devoted to farms, orchards and nurseries.

Following the Second World War, cheap electricity from nearby Niagara Falls and better transportation access due to the new (1939) Queen Elizabeth Way encouraged both light industry and families to move to Burlington. The population skyrocketed as new homes were built, encouraging developers to build even more new homes. On 1 January 1958, Burlington officially annexed most of the Township of Nelson, as well as Aldershot, formerly a part of East Flamborough Township. By 1967, the last cash crop farm within the city had been replaced by the Burlington Centre.

Burlington was the site of the Brant Inn built by the lake in 1917, which became famous during the ’40s and ’50s for showing big-band performers.

By 1974, with a population exceeding 100,000, Burlington was incorporated as a city. The extremely high rate of growth continued, and between 2001 and 2006, the population of Burlington grew by 9%, compared to Canada's overall growth rate of 5.4%. By 2006, the population topped 160,000.

Geography

Burlington is at the southwestern end of Lake Ontario, just to the north east of Hamilton and the Niagara Peninsula, roughly in the geographic centre of the urban corridor known as the Golden Horseshoe. The main urban area is south of the Parkway Belt and Hwy. 407. The land north of this, and north Aldershot is used primarily for agriculture, rural residential and conservation purposes. The Niagara Escarpment, Lake Ontario and the sloping plain between the escarpment and the lake make up the land area of Burlington. The city is no longer a port; sailing vessels in the area are used for recreational purposes and moor at a 215 slip marina in LaSalle Park.

Climate
Burlington's climate is humid continental (Köppen climate classification Dfa) with hot, humid summers and cold and snowy winters. The climate is moderated somewhat by its proximity to Lake Ontario.

Although it shares the continental climate found in Southern Ontario, its proximity to Lake Ontario moderates winter temperatures and it also benefits from a sheltering effect of the Niagara Escarpment, allowing the most northerly tracts of Carolinian forest to thrive on the Escarpment that runs through western sections of city. Several species of flora and fauna usually found only in more southern climes are present in Burlington, including paw-paw, green dragon (Arisaema dracontium), tuckahoe (Peltandra virginica), American columbo (Frasera caroliniensis), wall-rue (Asplenium ruta-muraria), plus the Louisiana waterthrush, the hooded warbler, the southern flying squirrel and the rare eastern pipistrelle. Near the visible promontory of Mount Nemo that rises some 200 m (650 ft) above the lake level, a "vertical forest" of white cedar clinging to the Escarpment face includes many small trees that are more than a thousand years old.

Hamilton Harbour, the western end of Lake Ontario, is bounded on its western shore by a large sandbar, now called the Beach strip, that was deposited during the last ice age. A canal bisecting the sandbar allows ships access to the harbour. The Burlington Bay James N. Allan Skyway (part of the Queen Elizabeth Way), and the Canal Lift Bridge allow access over the canal.

Demographics

According to the 2016 census, Burlington's population was 183,314 where 48% of residents were male and 52% female. Minors (individuals up to the age of 19) made up 22.6% of the population (almost identical to the national average of 22.4%), and seniors (age 65+) were 19.2% (higher than the national average of 16.9%). This older population was also reflected in Burlington's median age of 43.3, which was higher than the Canadian median of 41.2.

Religion 
According to the 2011 Census, 70% of Burlington residents identify as Christian, with Catholics (31.5%) making up the largest denomination, followed by Anglican (10%), United Church (9.2%), and other denominations. Others identify as Muslim (2%), Hindu (1.1%), Sikh (1%), Buddhist ( 0.4%), Jewish (0.4%), and with other religions. 25% of the population report no religious affiliation.

Language 
According to the 2016 Census, the most common mother tongue in Burlington is English (78.7%), followed by French (1.6%), Spanish (1.5%), Polish (1.3%), and Arabic (1.2). The three most commonly known languages are English (99.1%), French (9%), and Spanish (2.5%).

Ethnicity 

The 2016 Census records a visible minority of 16%.

The top 11 ethnic origins from the 2016 Census are listed in the accompanying table. Percentages add up to more than 100% because respondents can report more than one ethnicity.

Note: Totals greater than 100% due to multiple origin responses.

Economy
Burlington's economic strength is the diversity of its economic base, mainly achieved because of its geography, proximity to large industries in southern Ontario (Canada's largest consumer market), its location within the Greater Toronto and Hamilton Area (GTHA) and proximity to Hamilton, and its transportation infrastructure including the Port of Hamilton on Burlington Bay. This diversity has allowed for sustained growth with regards to the economy. The city has a robust economy with potential for growth – it is at the hub of the Golden Horseshoe, is largely driven by both the automotive and manufacturing sectors.

No single employer or job sector dominates Burlington's economy. The leading industrial sectors, in terms
of employment, are food processing, packaging, electronics, motor vehicle/transportation, business services,
chemical/pharmaceutical and environmental. The top five private sector employers in Burlington are Fearmans Pork Inc, Cogeco Cable, Evertz Microsystems, Boehringer Ingelheim and EMC2. Other notable business include The EBF Group, ARGO Land Development, The Sunshine Doughnut Company and TipTapPay Micropayments Ltd. The largest public sector employers in the city are the City of Burlington, the Halton District School Board, the Halton Catholic District School Board and Joseph Brant Hospital.

Burlington Centre and Mapleview Centre are popular malls within the city. The city's summer festivals include Canada's Largest Ribfest, and the Burlington Sound of Music Festival which also attract many visitors.

Arts and culture

Organizations
The Burlington Teen Tour Band has operated in the city since 1947, including members between the ages of 13 and 21. The marching band are regular participants in major international parades. They are also referred to as "Canada's Musical Ambassadors" and have represented Canada all over the world. One such occasion was during the 2018 Tournament of Roses Parade, where the band represented Canada for the fifth time in the band's history.
The band is led by Rob Bennett, managing director.

The Junior Redcoats are the younger version of the Teen Tour Band. The band includes children between the ages of 9 to 12. The Junior Redcoats' major performances are most commonly at the Burlington Santa Claus Parade, the Waterdown Santa Claus Parade, the Burlington Performing Arts Centre (along with the Teen Tour Band) and the Sound of Music Parade. They are directed by Caroline Singh.

The Burlington Concert Band has been in operation since 1908. The band, composed of local volunteer musicians, plays a wide variety of musical styles and repertoire. It primarily performs to raise money for charitable causes. The Burlington Concert Band is a participating member of Performing Arts Burlington as well as the Canadian Band Association. The band maintains an open membership policy, allowing anyone who feels they can handle the music competently to join without an audition. Its primary venue has been the Burlington Performing Arts Centre since it opened in 2011. Zoltan Kalman is the former director of the Burlington Concert Band that is led by an elected board headed by Steven Hewis. The current musical director is Joanne Romanow.

The Burlington Symphony Orchestra, formed in 1973, is a community orchestra under the direction of Denis Mastromonaco.

Attractions 

On the shore of Lake Ontario, Spencer Smith Park features a shoreline walking path, an observatory, water jet play area and restaurant. The park includes the Burlington Rotary Centennial Pond, used for model sail boating and ice-skating. Festivals in Spencer Smith Park include Ribfest, the Sound of Music Festival, Canada Day, Children's Festival and Lakeside Festival of Lights.

The Brant Street Pier opened in Spencer Smith Park during the Sound of Music Festival in 2013.

The Art Gallery of Burlington contains permanent and temporary exhibits.

The Royal Botanical Gardens in Burlington is the largest botanical garden in Canada.

Located at The Village Square in Burlington's downtown are historic landmarks, businesses, shopping, and dining area.

Mount Nemo Conservation Area is operated by Conservation Halton. Bronte Creek Provincial Park features a campground and recreational activities.

The local sections of the Bruce Trail and the Niagara Escarpment, which is a UNESCO designated World Biosphere Reserve, provide hiking trails. Kerncliff Park, in a decommissioned quarry on the boundary with Waterdown, is a naturalized area on the lip of the Niagara Escarpment. The Bruce Trail runs through the park, at many points running along the edge of the cliffs, providing an overlook.

The Joseph Brant Museum has exhibits on the history of Burlington, the Eileen Collard Costume Collection, Captain Joseph Brant and the visible storage gallery. Ireland House at Oakridge Farm is a museum depicting family life from the 1850s to the 1920s. Freeman Railway Station (1906) of the Grand Trunk Railway, reopened as an interpretive centre in 2017. 

Burlington offers four indoor and two outdoor pools, one splash park, nine splash pads, seven arenas and ice centres, six community centres and nine golf courses. The Appleby Ice Centre is a 4-pad arena, used year-round for skating and ice hockey.

The Burlington Performing Arts Centre is a 940-seat facility opened in 2011.

Malls and shopping

Burlington Centre is a two-storey mall opened in 1968, and Mapleview Centre is a two-storey mall opened in 1990.

Sports
Burlington doesn't host any professional teams, though several minor league teams are based in the city.

International competition

Burlington, Ontario, founded the Burlington International Games (B.I.G.). The games were first held in 1969 "to offer an athletic and cultural exchange experience for the youth of Burlington".
Until recently, the games took place between Burlington, Ontario, and Burlington, Vermont, United States. But, other cities from places such as Quebec, Japan, the Netherlands, and the U.S. have all had athletes compete since 1998. The games celebrated their 40th anniversary in 2009 and the competition ceased in 2010 due to limited participation in later years.

Government

Local government

The city is divided into six wards, each represented by a city councillor. The mayor, who chairs the city council, is Marianne Meed Ward.

Council elected for 2018–2022 and entirely re-elected for 2022-2026  

 Mayor: Marianne Meed Ward
 Ward 1: Kelvin Galbraith
 Ward 2: Lisa Kearns
 Ward 3: Rory Nisan 
 Ward 4: Shawna Stolte
 Ward 5: Paul Sharman
 Ward 6: Angelo Bentivegna

Federal

Federally, the city is represented by three MPs whose ridings cover parts of the city:

Burlington (covers most of the city): Karina Gould, Member of Parliament (Liberal)
Milton (the mainly rural countryside north of Highway 407): Adam van Koeverden (Liberal)
Oakville North-Burlington (the area bounded by Highway 407 to the north, Upper Middle Road to the south, Guelph Line to the west and 9th Line, Oakville to the east): Pam Damoff (Liberal)

Provincial
Provincially, the city is represented by three MPPs, whose ridings are geographically contiguous with their federal counterparts:

Burlington: Natalie Pierre (Progressive Conservative)
Milton: Parm Gill (Progressive Conservative)
Oakville North-Burlington: Effie Triantafilopoulos (Progressive Conservative)

Infrastructure

Transportation

Burlington Transit, the public transport provider in the city, provides bus service on a transportation grid centred on three commuter GO Train stations: Appleby, Burlington and Aldershot.

Major transportation corridors through the city include the Queen Elizabeth Way, Highway 403, Highway 407, and Dundas Street (former Highway 5). Commuter rail service is provided by GO Transit at the Appleby GO Station, Burlington GO Station and the Aldershot GO station. Intercity rail service is provided by Via Rail at Aldershot, which also serves Hamilton. Rail cargo transportation is provided by both Canadian National Railway and Canadian Pacific.

Burlington Airpark in the city's north end is a thriving general-aviation without regular commercial passenger flight service. Some charter operations are provided.

On 26 February 2012, a Via Rail train traveling from Niagara Falls to Toronto Union Station derailed in Burlington, with three fatalities.

Emergency services

Halton Regional Police Service provides law enforcement.

The Burlington Fire Department offers emergency services from eight fire stations. The services is made up of both career and volunteer fire fighters.

Paramedic services are provided by Halton Region Paramedic Services.

Joseph Brant Memorial Hospital is located in downtown Burlington.

Education
Burlington's public elementary and secondary schools are part of the Halton District School Board. Burlington's Catholic elementary and secondary schools are part of the Halton Catholic District School Board. French public elementary and secondary schools are part of the Conseil scolaire Viamonde and French catholic elementary and secondary schools are part of the Conseil scolaire catholique MonAvenir. Several private schools are also available in the city.

Elementary schools
There are 29 public elementary schools and 14 Roman Catholic elementary schools in Burlington.

High schools
There are six public high schools and three Catholic high schools in the area.

Public
Aldershot School (1964) Sports Team: Lions
Burlington Central High School (1922) Sports Team: Trojans
Frank J. Hayden Secondary School (2013) Sports Team: Huskies
Gary Allan High School Burlington Campus – Adult Learners School
M.M. Robinson High School (1963) Sports Team: Rams
Nelson High School (1957) Sports Team: Lords

Catholic
Assumption Secondary School (1977) Sports Team: Crusaders
Corpus Christi Catholic Secondary School (2008) Sports Team: Longhorns
Notre Dame Secondary School (1989) Sports Team: Fighting Irish

Universities
Australian university Charles Sturt University has had a study centre in Burlington since 2005 and offers programs in Master of International Education, Bachelor of Early Childhood Studies and Master of Business Administration. .

Media

Online media
BurlingtonToday.com is an online local news source in Burlington, offering the latest breaking news, weather updates, entertainment, sports and business features, obituaries and more.

Print media
Several publications are either published in or around Burlington, or have Burlington as one of their main subjects, including Burlington Post and View Magazine.

Radio
Burlington is part of the Hamilton radio market. One radio station, FM 107.9 CJXY, is licensed to Burlington and another, FM 94.7 CHKX, to "Hamilton/Burlington." Both presently broadcast from studios in Hamilton. Burlington listeners are also served by stations licensed to Toronto, St. Catharines, Niagara Falls and Buffalo, New York.

Television stations
Burlington is primarily served by media based in Toronto (other than those noted below), as it is geographically in the Greater Toronto and Hamilton Area (GTHA).
 YourTV from the studio in the Cogeco Cable Headquarters at Harvester Road & Burloak Drive.
Yes TV is based in Burlington with studios on the North Service Road near the junction of the QEW, 403 and 407.

Notable people

Visual art and writing
Robert Bateman (born 1930), painter.
Nicole Dorsey, film director and screenwriter
Margaret Lindsay Holton (born 1955), artist, author, and designer.
Donato Mancini, poet
Sylvia McNicoll (born 1954), author of over twenty novels for children and young adults
John Lawrence Reynolds (born 1939), author, winner of two Arthur Ellis Awards
Kelly Richardson (born 1972), artist, born in Burlington.
James Picard (born 1964), artist and filmmaker

Music
James Anthony (born 1955), USA Hall of Fame Blues Guitarist.
Boys Night Out – rock band.
The Creepshow, psychobilly band
Jeff Danna (born 1964), film music composer.
Dead and Divine – metal / hardcore band
Finger Eleven – alternative rock band; all attended Lester B. Pearson High School
Grade – rock band
Sarah Harmer (born 1970), singer and songwriter; attended Lester B. Pearson High School
Jordan Hastings (born 1982), Alexisonfire, drummer
Idle Sons – rock band; attended Lester B. Pearson, Aldershot and M.M. Robinson High Schools
Jersey (1995–2005), ska punk band
Melissa McClelland (born 1979), singer and songwriter.
Devraj Patnaik (born 1975), music composer, odissi dancer and choreographer
Saint Alvia, punk rock band
Silverstein – post-hardcore band
Spoons – 1980s new wave band
Tebey (born 1983), country music artist, attended Assumption Secondary School
Walk Off the Earth, alternative rock band
Adrianne Pieczonka (born 1963), operatic soprano singer

Sports
Caleb Agada (born 1994), Nigerian-Canadian basketball player in the Israeli Premier League and for the Nigerian national basketball team
Josh Anderson (born 1994), NHL player, Montreal Canadiens, born in Burlington
Steve Bauer (born 1959), road bicycle racer; Olympic Silver Medalist (1984 Los Angeles Games); competed in 11 Tours de France, one of only two Canadians to wear the Yellow jersey; born in St. Catharines but resides in Burlington.
Ryan Bomben (born 1987), played for the Toronto Argonauts of the Canadian Football League, currently is a free agent.
Melanie Booth (born 1984), soccer player (Canadian Soccer Association, Florida Gators NCAA)
Cory Conacher (born 1989), NHL player, Buffalo Sabres, New York Islanders, Syracuse Crunch.
Angela Coughlan (19532009), swimmer, winner of a bronze medal at the 1968 Olympic Games; a gold, two silvers and a bronze at the 1970 British Commonwealth Games; a gold and three silvers at the 1971 Pan American Games.
Adam Creighton (born 1965), retired professional hockey player who played 708 NHL games
Renata Fast (born 1994), professional ice hockey player and Canadian Olympian 
Tony Gabriel (born 1948), retired CFL tight end with the Ottawa Rough Riders and Hamilton Tiger-Cats. eight-time CFL all-star, league MVP 1978, twice winner of the Grey Cup.
Frank Hayden, Developed the Special Olympics.
Graham Hood (born 1972), competitive middle distance runner, Olympian, Pan Am Games champion; Born in Winnipeg but raised in Burlington. Competed at 1992 Olympics (Barcelona) and 1996 Olympics (Atlanta). Gold medallist, 1500 m, at 1999 Pan Am Games (Winnipeg).
Russ Jackson, retired CFL quarterback, has lived in Burlington since his retirement from teaching
Ashley Johnston (born 1992), former professional ice hockey player and captain of the Metropolitan Riveters
Josh Jooris (born 1990), NHL player, Toronto Marlies, born in Burlington
Mfiondu Kabengele (born 1997), Canadian professional basketball player for the Los Angeles Clippers
Becky Kellar-Duke (born 1975), hockey player; four-time Olympic medalist
Mark Lawrence (born 1972), ice hockey winger and coach
Jesse Lumsden (born 1982), running back with the Edmonton Eskimos and the Hamilton Tiger Cats of the Canadian Football League and Canadian Olympian in the Men's Two and Four-Man Bobsleigh at the Vancouver 2010 Olympics; attended Nelson High School.
David Matsos (born 1973), former AHL hockey player; current assistant coach of the Windsor Spitfires
Trevor Meier (born 1973), former Swiss Nationalliga 'A' Hockey Player, various clubs 1993–2012; born in Oakville, raised in Burlington, and resides in Switzerland.
Andy O'Brien (born 1979), Irish soccer player, Star Striker of the 2004–2005 UCD Super League Champions, Surprise X Saint Germain.
Mark Oldershaw (born 1983), Canadian sprint canoeist who competed at the 2008 Olympics (Beijing) and won a bronze medal in C-1 1000 m at the 2012 Olympics (London)
Dave Ridgway (born 1959), placekicker, Saskatchewan Roughriders CFL 1982–1996. Attended M.M. Robinson High School. Inducted into Canadian Football Hall of Fame in 2003. Played NCAA football for the University of Toledo Rockets 19771980.
Melville Marks Robinson (18881974), founder of the Commonwealth Games.
Chris Schultz (1960–2021), offensive tackle with the NFL Dallas Cowboys and CFL Toronto Argonauts, and sportscaster for TSN; attended Aldershot High School
Ron Sedlbauer (born 1954), former NHL player from 1974-1981.
 Simisola Shittu (born 1999), British-born Canadian basketball player for Ironi Ness Ziona of the Israeli Basketball Premier League
Jordan Szwarz (born 1991), ice hockey player for the Belleville Senators of the AHL.
Chad Wiseman (born 1981), AHL player, Albany Devils, born in Burlington
Shane Wright (born 2004), NHL and AHL player, captain of Team Canada at the 2023 World Juniors, born and raised in Burlington.

TV, film, and stage
Jillian Barberie (born 1966), actress and television hostess, attended Assumption Secondary School
Lally Cadeau (born 1948), actor, played Janet King on Road to Avonlea
Carlos Bustamante – YTV The Zone host and Entertainment Tonight Canada reporter, attended Notre Dame Catholic Secondary School
Jim Carrey (born 1962), comedian and actor
Nicole Dorsey, screenwriter and director
Ryan Gosling (born 1980), actor
Torri Higginson (born 1969), actress
Myles Erlick (born 1998), actor and dancer
Ellora Patnaik (born 1968), actor and odissi dancer
Andrew Stetson (born 1979), model, resides in Burlington
Gordie Tapp (1922–2016) comedian and country & western musician, (Grand Ole Opry and Hee Haw), resided in Burlington
Michael Bradshaw (1933–2001) actor, resided in Burlington
Katherine Barrell, (born 1990), actress, writer, producer and director currently best known for portraying Officer Nicole Haught in Wynonna Earp

Crime
 Leslie Mahaffy (July 5, 1976 – June 16, 1991) was a resident of Burlington and a victim of serial killers and rapists Paul Bernardo and Karla Homolka.

Twin cities
Burlington has twin-city relationships with the following cities:
 Apeldoorn, Gelderland, Netherlands
 Itabashi, Japan

Past city relationships:
 Burlington, Vermont, United States (through the BIG, Burlington International Games)
 Burlington, Iowa, United States
 Myrtle Beach, South Carolina, United States

See also
Burlington City Council
Burlington Executive Aerodrome

Notes

References

External links

 
Cities in Ontario
Lower-tier municipalities in Ontario
Populated places on Lake Ontario in Canada
Populated places established in 1874
1874 establishments in Ontario